This is a list of large, well-known, interstate, or international companies headquartered in Kent, Washington.


A

B
 Blue Origin - privately funded aerospace company set up by Amazon.com founder Jeff Bezos; develops technologies to enable private human access to space with the goal of dramatically lower cost and increased reliability
 Boeing Space & Defense - Washington State headquarters; engineers and manufactures military aircraft and missiles, as well as space exploration equipment such as the lunar rover

C

D
 Diamondback Bicycles - a major bicycle brand 
 Door to Door Storage - self-storage company; introduced portable, containerized storage to the industry

E

F
 Fenwick - Pioneers in fiberglass and graphite fishing rods. Founded in 1952 and named after Fenwick Lake in Kent Washington. They have since been bought and moved to Columbia, South Carolina.

G

H

I

J

K

L
 LaserMotive - engineering firm developing technologies for efficiently transmitting power via lasers, a form of wireless energy transfer commonly called "laser power beaming"

M

N
 Novara - REI's brand of bicycles and cycling clothing

O
 Oberto Sausage Company - family-owned; makes beef jerky, pepperoni and other snack sausages 
 Omax Corporation - second largest water jet manufacturer in the US

P
 Pacific Coast Condensed Milk Company - manufactured and marketed food products, including Carnation evaporated milk, with its famous slogan that it came from "Contented Cows"
 Pay 'n Pak - home improvement chain; operated 112 stores on the West Coast 
 Puget Sound Electric Railway - interurban railway that ran between Tacoma and Seattle 
 Puget Systems - custom computer business operating primarily through their website; sells a mixture of custom and preconfigured computers including laptops, desktops, and servers

Q

R
 Raleigh Bicycle Company USA - US headquarters of one of the oldest manufacturers of bicycles, motorcycles, and three-wheel cars 
 Redline bicycles - manufacturer of BMX, freestyle, cyclocross, mountain, and road bicycles and components 
 REI - retail corporation organized as a consumers' cooperative, selling outdoor recreation gear, sporting goods, and clothing

S
 Seattle-Tacoma Box Company - manufacturer of shipping containers, crates, boxes, and other wooden products

T
 Tazo Tea Company -  tea and tisane manufacturer specializing in New Age-style marketing and product labeling 
 ThyssenKrupp Aerospace - engineers and manufactures carbon fiber on a variety of Boeing products, including commercial aviation aircraft, military aircraft, and space and communications systems
 Torker - brand of bicycles, unicycles, strollers, and trailers, as well as cycling clothing

U

V

W

X
 X10 Wireless Technology - manufactures and markets wireless video cameras

Y

Z

References

Kent